Nicolas Savant-Aira (born 30 November 1980) is a French wheelchair table tennis player competing in Class 5. He is currently playing for French club Olimpique Hyerois.

General interest
Savant-Aira began playing table tennis aged 12 in Aix-en-Provence. For ten years he also practiced swimming at the same club, reaching national level in competitions. He is a double French national champion. By claiming gold at the 2011 European Championships in Split, Croatia, he qualified directly for the London 2012 Paralympics.
Besides being an elite level athlete, he studied for a BTS and works as an IT developer.

Career record

European Championships
 2011 Split: Men's Singles Class 5
 2007 Kranjska Gora: Men's Team Class 5
 2009 Genoa: Men's Singles Class 5
 2011 Split: Men's Team Class 5

References

External links 
 
 

1980 births
French male table tennis players
Table tennis players at the 2012 Summer Paralympics
Paralympic table tennis players of France
Medalists at the 2012 Summer Paralympics
Paralympic medalists in table tennis
Paralympic bronze medalists for France
Sportspeople from Aix-en-Provence
Living people
Table tennis players at the 2020 Summer Paralympics
21st-century French people